Merrit may refer to:

People 
 Merrit Cecil Walton (1915-1969), United States Marine platoon sergeant
 E. B. Merrit, pen name of Canadian author Miriam Waddington (1917–2004)
 Milo Merrit (1915–2009), American politician

Trees 
 Eucalyptus flocktoniae, a tree commonly known as merrit
 Eucalyptus urna, a tree commonly known as merrit

See also 
 Merit (disambiguation)
 Meritt (disambiguation)
 Merritt (disambiguation)